Erinnyis ello, the ello sphinx, is a moth of the family Sphingidae. The species was first described by Carl Linnaeus in his 1758 10th edition of Systema Naturae. It is distributed from Argentina through Central America to the United States as far north as Nevada.

The ello sphinx can be parasitized by the braconid wasp Microplitis figueresi.

Subspecies
Erinnyis ello ello (Americas)
Erinnyis ello encantada Kernbach, 1962 (Galápagos Islands)

References

External links
Ello Sphinx. Moths of America.

Erinnyis
Moths described in 1758
Taxa named by Carl Linnaeus
Moths of North America
Sphingidae of South America
Moths of South America